The England women's national basketball team represents England in international basketball competitions. The team is organized by England Basketball, the sport's governing body in England. In 2005 England, along with the basketballscotland and their counterparts in Wales combined forces to form the Great Britain women's national basketball team, with the target goal to field a competitive team capable of winning medals at the London 2012 summer Olympics.

Commonwealth Games

Melbourne 2006

The men's and women's teams were competing for the first time as England in a major multi-sport event, and it was the first Commonwealth Games in which basketball was featured.

The women's team included Jane Thackray, who had more than 50 international appearances.  Also on the squad was Andrea Congreaves, one of the most outstanding players produced by England, as well as some exciting up-and-coming talent.

In the game for the bronze medal, England outscored Nigeria for the first three quarters, but was forced to withstand a sickening comeback when Nigeria shot 29 points to England's 23 in the last quarter.  The top scorer for England was Andrea Congreaves with 21 points, Shelly Boston scored 14 and Rosalee Mason with 12 points.

Team
 Rosalee Mason
 Claire Maytham
 Sally Kaznica
 Kristy Lavin
 Caroline Ayres
 Louise Gamman
 Jo Sarjant
 Andrea Congreaves
 Shelly Boston
 Katie Crowley
 Gillian D'Hondt
 Jane Thackray

Coaching Staff
Coach - Bazany, Branislav
Assistant coach - Clark, Mark

See also
England men's national basketball team
Basketball at the 2006 Commonwealth Games
England at the 2006 Commonwealth Games (Basketball)

References

Women's national basketball teams
Basketball